Sulcus of the tongue may refer to:

 Median sulcus of the tongue
 Terminal sulcus of tongue